Jablonec is a village and municipality in western Slovakia in Pezinok District in the Bratislava region.

Genealogical resources
The records for genealogical research are available at the state archive "Statny Archiv in Bratislava, Slovakia"
 Roman Catholic church records (births/marriages/deaths): 1774–1897 (parish B)

See also
 List of municipalities and towns in Slovakia

References

External links

  Official page

Surnames of living people in Jablonec

Villages and municipalities in Pezinok District